Certified Quality Engineer, often abbreviated CQE, is a certification given by the American Society for Quality (ASQ). These engineers are professionally educated in quality engineering and quality control.

They are trained in researching and preventing unnecessary costs through lack of quality, lost production costs, lost market share due to poor quality, etc. They possess the knowledge needed to set up quality control circles, assess potential quality risks, and evaluate human factors and natural process variation.

Scope 
CQE training includes the following topics:

Management Systems
Project Management
Quality Information Systems
Leadership Principles and Techniques
Training
Cost of Quality
Quality Philosophies & Approaches
History of Quality
Total Quality Management
Customer Relations
Quality Deployment
Supplier Qualification & Certification Systems
Quality Systems
Documentation Systems
Configuration Management
Planning, Controlling and Assuring Product and Process Quality
Design Inputs and Design Review
Validation and Qualification Methods
Process Capability
Interpretation of Technical Drawings and Specifications
Material Control
Acceptance Sampling
Calibration Systems
Measurement Systems
Measurement System Analysis
Gage Repeatability and Reproducibility (Gage R & R)
Destructive and Nondestructive Testing and Measuring
Traceability to Standards
Reliability and Risk Management
Design of Systems for Reliability
Failure Mode and Effects Analysis (FMEA)
Fault Tree Analysis (FTA)
Management and Planning Tools
Corrective Action
Preventive Action
Overcoming Barriers to Quality Improvement
Concepts of Probability and Statistics
Properties and Applications of Probability Distributions
Tests for Means, Variances, and Proportions
Statistical Decision Making
Drawing Valid Statistical Conclusions
Statistical Process Control
Control Charts
Design of Experiments

Techniques
Some techniques that Quality Engineers use in quality engineering/assurance include:
Statistical Process Control
Deming's Wheel
Total Quality Management (TQM)
Six Sigma

Applications
These techniques are applicable company/system wide and are, by definition, not only developed for manufacturing processes.
Application areas include:
Purchasing
Sales and After-sales Support
Manufacturing
Customer Service
Human Resource Management
Research and Development
Information Technology

Professional certification
The American Society for Quality (ASQ) is a professional institute that examines the professional competency of candidates and, if found to be acceptable, awards them with official certification.
This process helps to establish and maintain a minimum body of knowledge and skill level among certified engineers.
The exam changes from test-to-test in minor detail and the body of knowledge is revised and updated by peer review committees set up by the ASQ.

There are two formats for the ASQ certification test:

 Computer Delivered - This CQE examination is a one-part, 175- multiple choice question, five-and-a-half-hour exam and is offered in English only. 160 multiple choice questions are scored and 15 are unscored.
 Paper and Pencil - This CQE examination is a one-part, 160- multiple choice question, five-hour exam and is offered in English only.

References

External links
ASQ.org
CQE-web
Quality Council
CQE Academy

Quality assurance